Nita Lake is a reservoir in the U.S. state of Mississippi.

Nita  is a name derived from the Chickasaw language meaning "bear".

References

Reservoirs in Mississippi
Bodies of water of Itawamba County, Mississippi
Mississippi placenames of Native American origin